World Literacy Crusade (WLC) was a non-profit organisation formed in 1992 by the Rev. Alfreddie Johnson to fight illiteracy, and supported by the Church of Scientology. The group uses "study technologies" and "drug rehabilitation technologies" developed by L. Ron Hubbard, the Church's founder. It has been characterized as a "Scientology front group", and has been promoted by celebrity Scientologists such as Isaac Hayes and Anne Archer.

Legal issues
The LA Times reported in 2008 that about 100 protestors gathered outside of the World Literacy Crusade offices after being sold fake low cost housing vouchers for as much as $1500. Officials at WLC admitted to selling the free vouchers, but stated they did not know they were fake. The Compton, Californian offices of the WLC housed a drug detox program using “dry heat sweat therapy”. In 2015 the executive director of WLC, Hanan Islam, Ronnie Steven Islam (AKA Rizza Islam) and her adult children were arrested for Medi-Cal fraud and insurance fraud for billing for this detox program.

Notes

References

 

Scientology-related controversies
Scientology beliefs and practices
Scientology organizations